Niall mac Séamuis Mac Mathghamhna, was a 15th-century priest in Ireland: he was appointed Bishop of Clogher on 14 June 1484, but the papal bulls were not expedited. He died in 1488.

References

15th-century Irish Roman Catholic priests
1488 deaths